In stochastic processes, chaos theory and time series analysis, detrended fluctuation analysis (DFA) is a method for determining the statistical self-affinity of a signal. It is useful for analysing time series that appear to be long-memory processes (diverging correlation time, e.g. power-law decaying autocorrelation function) or 1/f noise.

The obtained exponent is similar to the Hurst exponent, except that DFA may also be applied to signals whose underlying statistics (such as mean and variance) or dynamics are non-stationary (changing with time). It is related to measures based upon spectral techniques such as autocorrelation and Fourier transform.

Peng et al. introduced DFA in 1994 in a paper that has been cited over 3,000 times as of 2022 and represents an extension of the (ordinary) fluctuation analysis (FA), which is affected by non-stationarities.

Calculation
Consider a bounded time series  of length , where , and let its mean value be denoted . Integration or summation converts this into an unbounded process :

 is called cumulative sum or profile. This process converts, for example, an i.i.d. white noise process into a random walk.

Next,  is divided into time windows of length  samples each, and a local least squares straight-line fit (the local trend) is calculated by minimising the squared errors within each time window. Let  indicate the resulting piecewise sequence of straight-line fits. Then, the root-mean-square deviation from the trend, the fluctuation, is calculated:

Finally, this process of detrending followed by fluctuation measurement is repeated over a range of different window sizes , and a log-log graph of  against  is constructed.

The scaling exponent  is calculated as the slope of a straight line fit to the log-log graph of  against  using least-squares. This exponent is a generalization of the Hurst exponent. Because the expected displacement in an uncorrelated random walk of length N grows like , an exponent of  would correspond to uncorrelated white noise. When the exponent is between 0 and 1, the result is fractional Gaussian noise, with the precise value giving information about the series self-correlations:

 : anti-correlated
 : uncorrelated, white noise
 : correlated
 : 1/f-noise, pink noise
 : non-stationary, unbounded
 : Brownian noise

Generalization to supralinear trends
Trends of higher order can be removed by higher order DFA, in which a linear fit is replaced by a polynomial fit. In the described case, linear fits are applied to the profile, thus it is called DFA1. To remove trends of higher order, DFA, uses polynomial fits of order .

In general, DFA of order  removes (polynomial) trends of order .

The Hurst R/S analysis removes constant trends in the original sequence and thus, in its detrending it is equivalent to DFA1.

Generalization to different moments 
Since in the fluctuation function  the square (root) is used, DFA measures the scaling-behavior of the second moment-fluctuations, this means . The multifractal generalization (MF-DFA) uses a variable moment  and provides . Kantelhardt et al. intended this scaling exponent as a generalization of the classical Hurst exponent. The classical Hurst exponent corresponds to the second moment for stationary cases  and to the second moment minus 1 for nonstationary cases .

Essentially, the scaling exponents need not be independent of the scale of the system. In the case  depends on the power  extracted from

Multifractal systems scale as a function . To uncover multifractality, Multifractal Detrended Fluctuation Analysis is one possible method.

Applications and study 

The DFA method has been applied to many systems, e.g. DNA sequences, neuronal oscillations, speech pathology detection, heartbeat fluctuation in different sleep stages, and animal behavior pattern analysis.

The effect of trends on DFA has been studied.

Relations to other methods, for specific types of signal

For signals with power-law-decaying autocorrelation 

In the case of power-law decaying auto-correlations, the correlation function decays with an exponent :
.
The three exponents are related by:
 
  and
 .
The relations can be derived using the Wiener–Khinchin theorem. The relation of DFA to the power spectrum method has been well studied.

Thus,  is tied to the slope of the power spectrum  and is used to describe the color of noise by this relationship: .

For fractional Gaussian noise 

For fractional Brownian motion 

In this context, FBM is the cumulative sum or the integral of FGN, thus, the exponents of their
power spectra differ by 2.

Pitfalls in interpretation
As with most methods that depend upon line fitting, it is always possible to find a number  by the DFA method, but this does not necessarily imply that the time series is self-similar. Self-similarity requires that the points on the log-log graph are sufficiently collinear across a very wide range of window sizes . Furthermore, a combination of techniques including MLE, rather than least-squares has been shown to better approximate the scaling, or power-law, exponent.

Also, there are many scaling exponent-like quantities that can be measured for a self-similar time series, including the divider dimension and Hurst exponent. Therefore, the DFA scaling exponent  is not a fractal dimension sharing all the desirable properties of the Hausdorff dimension, for example, although in certain special cases it can be shown to be related to the box-counting dimension for the graph of a time series.

See also
 Multifractal system
 Self-organized criticality
 Self-affinity
 Time series analysis
 Hurst exponent

References

External links 
  Tutorial on how to calculate detrended fluctuation analysis in Matlab using the Neurophysiological Biomarker Toolbox.
 FastDFA MATLAB code for rapidly calculating the DFA scaling exponent on very large datasets.
 Physionet A good overview of DFA and C code to calculate it.
 MFDFA Python implementation of (Multifractal) Detrended Fluctuation Analysis.

Autocorrelation
Fractals